Justus von Liebig (1803–1873) was a German chemist.

Liebig may also refer to:
Liebig (crater), a lunar crater
Pueblo Liebig, a village and municipality in Argentina
Liebig's Extract of Meat Company, originator of Liebig and Oxo meat extracts

People with the surname
Christopher Liebig, (born 1987), German rugby union player
Robert Liebig, German luger of the late 1920s
Steffen Liebig (born 1989), German rugby union player
Tina Liebig (born 1980), German racing cyclist